Vista del Lago Visitors Center is a visitor center above Pyramid Lake in Los Angeles County, between the communities of Gorman and Castaic, near Interstate 5. It features an outdoor overlook of Pyramid Lake and interpretive displays by the  California Department of Water Resources, including slide shows and a video.

References

External links

Buildings and structures in Los Angeles County, California
California State Water Project
Tourist attractions in Los Angeles County, California